The NSWRL Harold Matthews Cup is a junior rugby league competition played in New South Wales between teams made up of players aged under 16. The competition is administered by the New South Wales Rugby League (NSWRL). The competition is made up of NSW-based clubs and includes both junior representative teams of the elite National Rugby League (NRL) and clubs that do not field teams in the NRL competition.

The competition is named after Harold Matthews, a Balmain Tigers secretary who later was appointed as manager of the Australian Test squad and later went on to become secretary of the NSWRL and ARL.

The clubs

In 2019, 2020, 2021 and 2022, 15 clubs fielded teams in the NSWRL UNE Harold Matthews Cup. 

  Balmain Tigers
  Canberra Raiders
  Canterbury-Bankstown Bulldogs
  Central Coast Roosters
  Cronulla-Sutherland Sharks
  Illawarra Steelers
  Manly-Warringah Sea Eagles
  Newcastle Knights
  North Sydney Bears
  Parramatta Eels
  Penrith Panthers
  South Sydney Rabbitohs
  St George Dragons
  Sydney Roosters
  Western Suburbs Magpies

In the 1970s and early 1980s the Harold Matthews Cup was played in a carnival format over three to five successive days. Teams from the country groups and regions competed alongside representative teams from the NSWRL clubs of Sydney. The competition later changed to a partial round-robin format.

Former teams in the Harold Matthews Cup include: Gold Coast Titans (2009), Melbourne Storm (2013-14), South-Western Sydney Academy of Sport (2008–16) and Western Sydney Academy of Sport (2007–17).

After the sixth round on March 14 & 15, the 2020 competition was suspended and subsequently cancelled due to the COVID-19 pandemic in Australia.

Harold Matthews Cup Premiers

Premiership Tally 

Bold means that the team is still currently plays in the competition.

See also

 Andrew Johns Cup
S. G. Ball Cup
Rugby League Competitions in Australia

References

 
Rugby league competitions in New South Wales
Recurring sporting events established in 1970
1970 establishments in Australia
Sports leagues established in 1970
Junior rugby league